The Keepers is a seven-episode American documentary web series that explores the unsolved murder of nun Catherine Cesnik in 1969. Cesnik taught English and drama at Baltimore's all-girls Archbishop Keough High School, and her former students believe that there was a cover-up by authorities after she suspected that a priest at the high school, A. Joseph Maskell, was guilty of sexually abusing students. The series was directed by Ryan White and released on Netflix in 2017.

Cast
Gemma Hoskins – former student and investigator
Abbie Fitzgerald Schaub – former student and investigator
Joseph Maskell – former priest and counselor
Jean Hargadon Wehner (a.k.a. Jane Doe) – former student
Teresa Lancaster (a.k.a. Jane Roe) – former student
Randy Lancaster – Teresa Lancaster's husband
Donna Von Den Bosch – former student
Juliana Farrell – former student
Deb Silcox – former student
Lil Hughes – former student
Chris Centofanti – former student
Mary Spence – former student
Marilyn Cesnik Radakovic – Sister Catherine's sister
Gerry Koob – former priest and Sister Catherine's former boyfriend
Tom Nugent – journalist and writer for the Baltimore City Paper
Bob Erlandson – journalist
Beverly Wallace – attorney for former students
Alan Horn – investigator
John Barnold – former captain, Baltimore City Police Department
James Scannell – former captain, Baltimore County Police Department
Brian Schwaab – former detective, Baltimore City Police Department
Gary Childs – detective, Baltimore County Police
Sharon A. H. May – former State's Attorney for Baltimore City
Edgar Davidson – possible suspect in the murder of sister Catherine
Deborah Yohn – Davidson's niece, who suspects her uncle's involvement in the murders based on anecdotes from her aunt, who is referred to as "Margaret" in the series.
Sharon Schmidt – daughter of Ronnie Schmidt and niece of Billy Schmidt, who suspects the involvement of both men in the murders.
Barbara Schmidt – mother of Sharon Schmidt, former wife of Ronnie Schmidt and sister-in-law to Billy Schmidt, who suspects the involvement of her husband and brother-in-law in the murders.
C. T. Wilson – Maryland state delegate
Charles Franz – former student at St. Clement's Church
Werner Spitz, MD – forensic pathologist

Episodes

Reviews
The Keepers was met with critical acclaim upon its release. The review aggregator Rotten Tomatoes gives the series an approval rating of 97% based on 30 reviews, with an average rating of 8.47/10. The site's critical consensus reads, "The Keepers draws on riveting, real-life terror to expose long-buried secrets—and tells an inspiring, brilliantly assembled story along the way." Pilot Viruet of Vice wrote of the series, "It's harrowing and upsetting, and it will haunt you for a long time, which is part of what makes it necessary viewing."

In Time magazine, Daniel D'Addario compared The Keepers with another Netflix true-crime series, Making a Murderer, stating that The Keepers does not lead its viewers to a definite conclusion about what happened. "While Sister Cathy Cesnik's death remains a mystery, its aftereffects include both crushing heartbreak and, for the amateur sleuths who seek to crack her case, a sense of making a difference... This isn't just more respectful to the victim than other true-crime stories, with their breathless delight at new clues. It's also more effective." According to Jack Seale in The Guardian, "Where other true crime hits have followed a linear chronology, The Keepers hops between 1969, the 1990s and today, striking a fine balance between narrative structure – a wow moment at the end of every episode – and respect for a subject that doesn’t need or deserve sensationalism."

Church response
The Archdiocese of Baltimore declined when asked by Netflix producers to comment on sexual misconduct allegations within the church. Later, the Archdiocese responded to the series by adding a FAQ page to its website, in which it stated allegations that the archdiocese knew of Maskell's sexual abuse prior to 1992 were false speculation.

References

External links
The Keepers on Netflix

Netflix original documentary television series
True crime television series
Television shows set in Baltimore
Films about Catholic priests
Media coverage of Catholic Church sexual abuse scandals
2010s American documentary television series
2017 American television series debuts
2017 American television series endings
Films about child sexual abuse
English-language Netflix original programming